Jakać is a river of Poland, a tributary of the Ruż near Szabły Młode.

Rivers of Poland
Rivers of Podlaskie Voivodeship